Moss is a surname related either to the Old English mos – a peat-bog, to the Irish "Maolmona", an ancient Gaelic devotee, or to the Hebrew "Moses" (מֹשֶׁה) and can be of either Jewish, Irish or English language origin.

History
Arlene B. Nichols Moss, American chair of the Daughters of the American Revolution
Roger Moss (born 1940), American historian
Stephen Moss (b. 1960), British naturalist

Literature
Howard Moss (1922–1987), American poet
Jason Moss (writer) (1975–2006), American writer and attorney
Mary Moss (1864–1914), American author and literary critic
Sarah Moss (born 1975), English writer and academic
Thylias Moss (born 1954), American poet

Music
David Moss (born 1949), American composer, percussionist and singer
Howard Moss (songwriter) (born 1975), Anglo-Irish singer songwriter and guitarist
Ian Moss (born 1955), Australian musician
James Moss (born 1971), American gospel musician and composer best known for his stage name J. Moss
Jerry Moss (born 1935), A&M Records founder
Jon Moss (born 1957), British drummer with Culture Club
Katie Moss (1881–1947), British singer and composer
Nick Moss (born 1969), American blues musician
Paul Moss, New Zealand record company executive
Bow Wow (born Shad Gregory Moss in 1987), American rapper

Politics
Allan A. Moss (1854–1929), American mayor
Annie Lee Moss (1905–1996), African American woman who was accused of being a Communist infiltrator in the Pentagon
Frank Moss (1911–2003), Democrat United States Senator from Utah
Hunter Holmes Moss Jr. (1874–1916), American lawyer and politician
Linda Moss, South African politician
Malcolm Moss (born 1943), British Conservative Party Member of Parliament
Matthew Moss (1863–1946), Australian member of parliament
Ralph W. Moss (U.S. Representative) (1862–1919)
Randolph Moss (born 1961), American judge and lawyer
Reginald Moss (1913–1995), British Labour Party Member of Parliament 1955–1959
William P. Moss (1897–1985), American lawyer and politician

Sports
Alan Moss (1930–2019), English cricketer
Albert Moss (cricketer) (1863–1945), English and New Zealand cricketer
Alfred Moss (1896–1972), British racing driver
Ambry Moss (born 1990), Bahamanian footballer
Avery Moss (born 1994), American football player
Bill Moss (1933–2010), British racing driver
Brad Moss (born 1971), American bridge player
Brandon Moss (born 1983), American baseball player
Brent Moss (1972-2022), American football player best known for his collegiate career
Charles Malcolm 'Mal' Moss (1905–1983), American baseball pitcher
Chris Moss (born 1980), American basketball player
Damian Moss (born 1976), Australian baseball player
David Moss (ice hockey) (born 1981), American professional hockey player 
Eric Moss (1974–2019), American football player
Frank Moss (goalkeeper) (1909–1970), English football goalkeeper and manager
Frank Moss (half-back) (1895–1965), English football half-back
Gail Moss (born 1938), American bridge player
Glen Moss (born 1983), New Zealand soccer player
Greg Moss (born 1982), Canadian football player
Harold Moss (1929-2020), American businessman and politician
Jarvis Moss (born 1984), American football player 
Jeff Moss (cricketer) (born 1947), Australian cricketer
Jonathan Moss (cricketer) (born 1975), Australian cricketer
John Henry Moss (1918–2009), American baseball executive
Johnny Moss (1907–1995), professional poker player, 3-time world champion of poker
Les Moss (1925–2012), American baseball player and manager
Neil Moss (footballer) (born 1975), English footballer
Pat Moss (1934–2008), British rally driver
Perry Moss (born 1926), American football player, coach, and executive
Randy Moss (born 1977), American football player
Randy Moss (sports reporter) (born 1959), American sports announcer and journalist
Reginald Moss (1868–1956), English cricketer
Riley Moss (born 2000), American football player
Santana Moss (born 1979), American football player
Sinorice Moss (born 1983), American football player
Stirling Moss (1929–2020), British racing driver
Tanya Moss (born 1964), New Zealand gymnast
Thaddeus Moss (born 1998), American football player
Zack Moss (born 1997), American football player

Television and film
Arnold Moss (1910–1989), American actor
Bertha Moss (1919–2008), Argentinian actress
Carrie-Anne Moss (born 1967), Canadian actress
Donna Moss, fictional character from The West Wing
Elisabeth Moss (born 1982), American actress
Jeff Moss (1942–1998), Sesame Street creator
Jennifer Moss (1945–2006), British actress
Laura Moss (born 1973), American actress
Maurice Moss, fictional character from The IT Crowd
Ronn Moss (born 1952), American actor

Theatre
Chloe Moss (born 1976), British dramatist
Edward Moss (1852–1912), British theatre promoter
Strafford Moss (1868–1941), British musical theatre tenor

Other
Colin Moss, (1914–2005), British artist
Cynthia Moss (born 1940), American wildlife researcher and author
Emani Moss (2003–2013), American murder victim
Frank Moss (lawyer) (1860–1920), criminal lawyer and Assistant District Attorney for New York City in the early 20th century
Frank Moss (technologist) (born 1949), American computer scientist
Frank A. Moss, (1862–1940), Australian mining engineer
Gérard Moss (born 1955), Brazilian aviator and environmentalist
Jacqueline Moss (1927–2005), American art historian
Joel M. Moss (born 1943), American nuclear physicist
John C. Moss (1838–1892), invented the first practicable photo-engraving process in 1863
Kate Moss (born 1974), British supermodel
Leonard Moss (1932-2021), British Anglican priest
 Llewelyn Moss, protagonist in the novel and film No Country for Old Men
Lydia Moss (1816–1908), American bank president and philanthropist
Mary Moss (1791–1875), mother of William Booth
Murray Moss, American design expert
Neil Moss (caver) (1938–1959), English caver
P. Buckley Moss (born 1933), American artist
Preacher Moss (born 1967), American comedian
Ralph W. Moss (writer) (born 1943), American writer
Sanford Alexander Moss (1872–1946), American aviation engineer
Tamara Moss (born 1987), Indian model
William Lorenzo Moss (1876–1957), American physician

See also
Hebraization of surnames
Moss (disambiguation)
Mosse

References
 

English-language surnames
Jewish surnames